The   was a member of the Cabinet of Japan who was responsible for Decentralization Reform. The position was abolished during the 2nd administration of Shinzō Abe. The last minister was Yoshitaka Shindō.

Ministers of State for Decentralization Reform

Former government ministries of Japan